The Palm Jumeirah Monorail is a monorail line on the Palm Jumeirah island in Dubai, United Arab Emirates. It is operated by the UK based Serco. The monorail connects the Palm Jumeirah to the mainland, with a planned further extension to the Red Line of the Dubai Metro.  The line opened on April 30, 2009. It is the first monorail in the Middle East.

The trains are driverless, with attendants for any emergency situations.

History
Construction began on the  monorail line in March 2006, under the supervision of Marubeni Corporation, with the monorail track completed in July 2008 and vehicle testing beginning in November 2008. Originally planned to open by December 2008, the opening was delayed to April 30, 2009. In 2010, day-to-day operations were taken over by the British company Serco.

The project budget is US$400 million, with an additional US$190M set aside for a  future extension to the Dubai Metro, while other sources state a budget of US$1.1 billion. A journey on the monorail costs Dhs20 one-way, 30 return.

The Al Ittihad Park station, originally intended to serve the cancelled Trump International Hotel and Tower development, was opened on July 3, 2017. Nakheel Mall station opened on November 28, 2019.

Technology
The Palm Jumeirah Monorail uses Hitachi Monorail straddle-type technology. The electro-mechanical works are carried out by ETA-Dubai in joint venture with Hitachi-Japan.

Ridership
The line has a theoretical capacity of 40,000 passengers per day, with trains running every few minutes during peak hours and every 15 to 20 minutes during off-peak hours. However, actual ridership averaged around 600 passengers per day during the first week, and the monorail is running "virtually empty". As of July 2017, the line runs every 11 minutes and averages 3,000 passengers per day.

Stations
 Atlantis Aquaventure station — Atlantis, The Palm*
 The Pointe station (Now opened) 
 Nakheel Mall station — formerly Trump Plaza and Village Center Station
 Al Ittihad Park station
 Palm Gateway station — Gateway Towers, connection to Dubai Tram at Palm Jumeirah station (out-of-station interchange)

Planned extension
 Red Line — connection to Dubai Metro

Dubai Internet City is the nearest metro station on the Dubai Metro Red Line.

References

External links
 

Driverless monorails
Alweg people movers
Railway lines opened in 2009
2009 establishments in the United Arab Emirates
Monorails in the United Arab Emirates
Transport in Dubai
Marubeni